Planaxis is a genus of small sea snails, marine gastropod mollusks in the family Planaxidae.

Species
Species within the genus Planaxis include:

 Planaxis savignyi Deshayes, 1844
 Planaxis sulcatus (Born, 1791)
 Planaxis suturalis E.A. Smith, 1872
 Planaxis virgatus E. A. Smith, 1872

Species brought into synonymy
 Planaxis (Supplanaxis) Thiele, 1929: synonym of Supplanaxis Thiele, 1929
 Planaxis abbreviata Pease, 1865: synonym of Planaxis niger Quoy & Gaimard, 1833
 Planaxis acuta Krauss, 1848: synonym of Supplanaxis acutus (Krauss, 1848)
 Planaxis acutus Krauss, 1848: synonym of Supplanaxis acutus (Krauss, 1848)
 Planaxis affinis Risso, 1826: synonym of Nassarius incrassatus (Strøm, 1768): synonym of Tritia incrassata (Strøm, 1768)
 Planaxis akuana Rehder, 1980: synonym of Hinea akuana (Rehder, 1980)
 Planaxis albersii Dunker, 1853: synonym of Planaxis atropurpurea Récluz, 1843
 Planaxis areolatus Lesson, 1842: synonym of Nassarius concinnus (Powys, 1835)
 Planaxis atra Pease, 1869: synonym of Planaxis niger Quoy & Gaimard, 1833
 † Planaxis aulacophorus Cossmann, 1889: synonym of † Hinea fischeri (de Raincourt, 1884) 
 † Planaxis beaumonti Bayan, 1870: synonym of † Supplanaxis beaumonti (Bayan, 1870)  (original combination)
 Planaxis beudantiana Risso, 1826: synonym of Nassarius cuvierii (Payraudeau, 1826): synonym of Tritia cuvierii (Payraudeau, 1826) 
 Planaxis brevis Quoy & Gaimard, 1833: synonym of Planaxis sulcatus (Born, 1778)
 Planaxis buccinea A. Adams, 1853: synonym of Planaxis buccineus A. Adams, 1853 (nomen dubium) (incorrect grammatical agreement of specific epithet)
 Planaxis buccinoides Deshayes, 1828: synonym of Planaxis sulcatus (Born, 1778)
 Planaxis canaliculata Duval, 1840: synonym of Planaxis canaliculatus Duval, 1840: synonym of Planaxis planicostatus G. B. Sowerby I, 1825: synonym of Supplanaxis planicostatus (G. B. Sowerby I, 1825) (incorrect gender agreement of specific epithet)
 Planaxis canaliculatus Duval, 1840: synonym of Planaxis planicostatus G. B. Sowerby I, 1825: synonym of Supplanaxis planicostatus (G. B. Sowerby I, 1825)
 Planaxis cingulata Gould, 1861: synonym of Cronia avenacea|Cronia (Usilla) avenacea (Lesson, 1842): synonym of Usilla avenacea (Lesson, 1842) (junior homonym of Planaxis cingulata A. Adams, 1853; Planaxis gouldii E. A. Smith, 1872 is a replacement name.)
 Planaxis circinatus Lesson, 1842: synonym of Planaxis planicostatus G. B. Sowerby I, 1825: synonym of Supplanaxis planicostatus ' (G. B. Sowerby I, 1825)
 †Planaxis dautzenbergi Glibert, 1949: synonym of † Stosicia planaxoides (Grateloup, 1838): synonym of † Stosicia buccinalis (Grateloup, 1828) 
 Planaxis decollata Quoy & Gaimard, 1833: synonym of Fissilabia decollata (Quoy & Gaimard, 1833)
 Planaxis desmarestiana Risso, 1826: synonym of Nassarius incrassatus (Strøm, 1768)
 Planaxis discrepans Risso, 1826: synonym of Nassarius corniculum (Olivi, 1792)
 Planaxis donatiana Risso, 1826: synonym of Nassarius cuvierii (Payraudeau, 1826): synonym of Tritia cuvierii (Payraudeau, 1826)
 Planaxis eboreus E. A. Smith, 1872: synonym of Angiola lineata (da Costa, 1778): synonym of Hinea lineata (da Costa, 1778)
 Planaxis fasciata Pease, 1868: synonym of Angiola punctostriata (E. A. Smith, 1872)
 Planaxis fasciatus Pease, 1868: synonym of Angiola fasciata (Pease, 1868)
 † Planaxis fischeri de Raincourt, 1884: synonym of † Hinea fischeri (de Raincourt, 1884)  (original combination)
 Planaxis fitcheliana Risso, 1826: synonym of Nassarius cuvierii (Payraudeau, 1826): synonym of Tritia cuvierii (Payraudeau, 1826) 
 Planaxis gouldii Smith, 1872: synonym of Cronia (Usilla) avenacea (Lesson, 1842)
 Planaxis griseus Brocchi, 1821: synonym of Planaxis savignyi Deshayes, 1844
 Planaxis hanleyi E. A. Smith, 1872: synonym of Supplanaxis niger (Quoy & Gaimard, 1833)
 Planaxis inepta Gould, 1861: synonym of Hinea inepta (Gould, 1861) (original combination)
 Planaxis labiosa A. Adams, 1853: synonym of Angiola labiosa (A. Adams, 1853): synonym of Hinea zonata (A. Adams, 1853)
 Planaxis laevigata Risso, 1826: synonym of Nassarius granum (Lamarck, 1822)
 Planaxis lineatus (da Costa, 1778): synonym of Angiola fasciata  (da Costa, 1778)
 Planaxis lineolata Risso, 1826: synonym of Nassarius cuvierii (Payraudeau, 1826)
 Planaxis lineolata Gould, 1849: synonym of Angiola punctostriata (E. A. Smith, 1872)
 Planaxis lineolatus Gould, 1849: synonym of  Angiola punctostriata (E. A. Smith, 1872)
 Planaxis longispira E.A. Smith, 1872: synonym of Angiola longispira (E.A. Smith, 1872): synonym of Hinea longispira (E. A. Smith, 1872) (original combination)
 Planaxis loques Risso, 1826: synonym of Nassarius cuvierii (Payraudeau, 1826): synonym of Tritia cuvierii (Payraudeau, 1826) 
 Planaxis mamillata Risso, 1826: synonym of Nassarius nitidus (Jeffreys, 1867): synonym of Tritia nitida (Jeffreys, 1867) (dubious synonym)
 Planaxis menkeanus Dunker, 1862: synonym of Planaxis sulcatus (Born, 1778)
 Planaxis molliana Risso, 1826: synonym of Nassarius cuvierii (Payraudeau, 1826): synonym of Tritia cuvierii (Payraudeau, 1826)
 Planaxis mollis G. B. Sowerby I, 1823: synonym of Hinea brasiliana (Lamarck, 1822)
 Planaxis nancyae Petuch, 2013: synonym of Supplanaxis nancyae (Petuch, 2013) (original combination)
 Planaxis nicobaricus Frauenfeld, 1866: synonym of Planaxis niger Quoy & Gaimard, 1833
 Planaxis niger Quoy & Gaimard, 1833: synonym of Supplanaxis niger (Quoy & Gaimard, 1833) 
 Planaxis nigra [sic] : synonym of Planaxis niger Quoy & Gaimard, 1833
 Planaxis nigritella Forbes, 1852: synonym of Planaxis obsoletus Menke, 1851
 Planaxis nucleola Mörch, 1876: synonym of Supplanaxis nucleus (Bruguière, 1789)
 Planaxis nucleus (Bruguière, 1789): synonym of Supplanaxis nucleus (Bruguière, 1789)
 Planaxis obscura A. Adams, 1853: synonym of Planaxis sulcatus (Born, 1778)
 Planaxis obsoletus Menke, 1851: synonym of Supplanaxis obsoletus (Menke, 1851) (original combination)
 Planaxis olivacea Risso, 1826: synonym of Nassarius corniculum (Olivi, 1792): synonym of Tritia corniculum (Olivi, 1792)
 Planaxis pigra Forbes, 1852: synonym of Hinea brasiliana (Lamarck, 1822)
 Planaxis piliger Philippi, 1849: synonym of Holcostoma piliger (Philippi, 1849)
 Planaxis planicostatus G.B. Sowerby, 1825: synonym of Supplanaxis planicostatus (G. B. Sowerby I, 1825) (original combination)
 Planaxis punctorostratus: synonym of Angiola punctostriata] (E. A. Smith, 1872): synonym of Hinea punctostriata (E. A. Smith, 1872) 
 Planaxis punctostriata Smith, 1872: synonym of Angiola punctostriata (Smith E.A., 1872): synonym of Hinea punctostriata (E. A. Smith, 1872) 
 Planaxis raricosta Risso, 1826: synonym of Nassarius corniculum (Olivi, 1792): synonym of Tritia corniculum (Olivi, 1792) 
 Planaxis riparia Risso, 1826: synonym of Nassarius cuvierii (Payraudeau, 1826): synonym of Tritia cuvierii (Payraudeau, 1826) 
 Planaxis rosacea Risso, 1826: synonym of Nassarius incrassatus (Strøm, 1768): synonym of Tritia incrassata (Strøm, 1768)
 Planaxis semisulcatus G. B. Sowerby I, 1823: synonym of Supplanaxis nucleus (Bruguière, 1789)
 Planaxis similis E. A. Smith, 1872: synonym of Planaxis niger Quoy & Gaimard, 1833
 Planaxis striatulus Philippi, 1851: synonym of Hinea zonata (A. Adams, 1853)
 Planaxis tenuis Risso, 1826: synonym of Nassarius cuvierii (Payraudeau, 1826): synonym of Tritia cuvierii (Payraudeau, 1826) 
 Planaxis trifasciata Risso, 1826: synonym of Nassarius corniculum (Olivi, 1792): synonym of Tritia corniculum (Olivi, 1792) 
 Planaxis turulosa Risso, 1826: synonym of Nassarius turulosus (Risso, 1826): synonym of Tritia turulosa (Risso, 1826) (original combination)
 Planaxis undulata Lamarck, 1822: synonym of Planaxis sulcatus (Born, 1778)
 Planaxis zonatus A. Adams, 1853: synonym of Hinea zonata (A. Adams, 1853) (original combination)

References

External links
 Lamarck, (J.-B. M.) de. (1822). Histoire naturelle des animaux sans vertèbres. Tome septième. Paris: published by the Author, 711 pp
 Smith, E. A. (1872). A list of the species of the genus Planaxis, with descriptions of eleven new species. Annals and Magazine of Natural History. ser. 4, 9: 37-47.
  Sowerby, G. B. II. (1877). Monograph of the genus Planaxis. In: Conchologia iconica, or illustrations of the shells of molluscous animals, vol. 20, pls 1-5. L. Reeve, London. 
 Sowerby, G. B. II. (1884). Planaxis Lamarck. In: G. B. Sowerby II (ed.), Thesaurus Conchyliorum, or monographs of Genera of Shells, Vol. 5(41-42): 171-177, pls 483-484. London, privately published
Gofas, S.; Le Renard, J.; Bouchet, P. (2001). Mollusca, in: Costello, M.J. et al. (Ed.) (2001). European register of marine species: a check-list of the marine species in Europe and a bibliography of guides to their identification. Collection Patrimoines Naturels, 50: pp. 180–213

Planaxidae
Bioluminescent molluscs